David Leslie Koch (born 7 March 1956), nicknamed "Kochie", is an Australian television presenter who is best known as a host of the Seven Network's breakfast program, Sunrise. From Adelaide, he began his media career as a financial journalist, writing for a number of different publications before eventually moving to television. Koch has been the chairman of the Port Adelaide Football Club, an Australian Football League (AFL) club, since October 2012.

Early life and financial journalism

Koch was born on 7 March 1956 in Adelaide, South Australia. He trained as an accountant and started as a cadet on the business pages of The Australian newspaper before joining BRW  magazine soon after its launch in the early 1980s. He was one of the founders of consumer finance journalism in Australia and created Personal Investment magazine, which made him the youngest editor in the Fairfax Media group. He then launched Personal Investment magazines in New Zealand and the UK. He produced Britain's first "rich list" which started in Money Magazine which he had bought for Fairfax.

In 1988, he launched trade publishing group Australian Financial Press in a joint venture with Fairfax. AFP went on to create Business Magazine, New Accountant and Money Management magazines.

He provides business and financial commentary for several publications, including Pacific Magazines, Yahoo Finance and the "Your Money" section of News Ltd newspapers.

Koch was a director of the NSW Small Business Development Corporation Ltd for eight years after its inception in 1996. As a former business owner and operator and now director of Pinstripe Media Pty Ltd, he speaks regularly at corporate events about small business, finance and investment issues.

Koch has presented over 100 episodes of a weekly small business program on the Seven Network, Business Builders, which helps private business owners improve their business. The program is produced by Koch's company Pinstripe Media.

In 2007, Koch launched Pinstripe Media, a video production and content marketing agency that manages a network of sites including Startup Daily, Flying Solo and Kochie's Business Builders.

In 2013, Koch launched KBB Digital, a digital marketing agency for small business which is an extension of the 'Kochie's Business Builders' brand.

In 2020, in partnership with Kylie Merritt, Koch launched ausbiz, an Australian business and finance streaming platform.

Television career

Sunrise 
Koch is currently co-host Seven Network's Sunrise breakfast program with Natalie Barr on weekdays. 

He was initially hired to replace Chris Reason who stepped down after a cancer diagnosis towards the end of 2002; however, his position later became permanent. He and his original co-host, Melissa Doyle, hosted the program over a period that saw viewer ratings grow until Sunrise became the leading breakfast television show in Australia.

Other 
Koch also co-hosted another Seven Network production, Where Are They Now?, also with then-Sunrise co-host Melissa Doyle. He also hosts a show for small businesses, Kochie's Business Builders, which airs on Sundays on the Seven Network.

Recognition

Koch was nominated for a silver Logie in 2004 and 2005 for Best TV Presenter.

Koch has written several practical books on family and business financial management; he has also published a book of jokes compiled from his daily joke segment on TV. The book was parodied in an episode of The Chaser's War on Everything where reading jokes from "Kochie" was the only thing that got a laugh at a stand-up comedy club. In a survey conducted by Money Management newspaper, his peers recognised him as one of the 10 most influential people of all time in the financial services industry. There may be a conflict of interest in this recognition he received from Money Management newspaper given he set up the publication via his trade publishing group Australian Financial Press (see above).

Koch was frequently parodied on the television show Comedy Inc., in which he was played by Paul McCarthy. Reader's Digest listed him in the top 50 Most Trusted Australians.

In 2007, readers of Banking and Finance Magazine voted Koch Australia's Best Finance Journalist while the Council of Small Business Organisations of Australia presented him with the "Small Business Champion award" in recognition of his support of Australian small business.

Koch was named 2007 Australian Father of the Year by the Australian Father's Day Council on 31 August 2007.

He appeared on Australian soap opera Home and Away in 2007 and appeared on All Saints in 2004 as an Elvis impersonator.

Koch was the number one ticket-holder of Australian Football League team Port Adelaide Football Club from 2007, jointly with Australian model and actress Teresa Palmer in 2009 and is a shareholder in the Sydney Kings basketball team.

Through a Sunrise campaign and his involvement in ShareLife, Koch influenced the federal government to establish a national authority (the Organ & Tissue Authority) to oversee Australia's organ transplant system. Previously Australia had the highest level of registered organ donors per head of population in the world but one of the lowest transplant rates. The new national authority aims to bring Australian transplant rates up to world's best practice. Koch was Chairman of the 'Organ and Tissue Authority Advisory Council' but resigned on-air, during a Sunrise broadcast on 27 May 2015, in protest over a government review of organ donation. Assistant Health Minister Fiona Nash had failed to advise him about the review.

Koch also played the voice of the "Australian Newsreader" in the 2009 DreamWorks film, Monsters vs. Aliens.

He has climbed Mt Kilimanjaro twice to raise money for charity and walked the Kokoda Track.

On 2 October 2012, Koch was announced as the chairman of the Port Adelaide Football Club a position he started at the beginning of 2013, succeeding Brett Duncanson.

In October 2014, Koch launched his website rescue competition (Rescue My Website), to help change the digital lives of 3 Australian small businesses.

Controversy

In April 2006, Koch walked the Kokoda Track in remembrance of Anzac Day. He was accompanied by his son A.J., his brother, his nephew, fellow news presenter Natalie Barr's husband Andrew, politicians Joe Hockey and Kevin Rudd, and Rudd's son. Their journey was documented for Sunrise and finished with a televised Anzac Day service, during which Koch's group controversially wore T-shirts advertising Seven News, which were prominently visible in the Sunrise broadcast.  Koch strenuously denied any impropriety. The company which organised the tour later said the T-shirt labelling was a safety issue commonly used to identify trekkers.

In May 2006, Koch and Sunrise co-host Melissa Doyle were acquitted of contempt of court charges in a Melbourne Local Court.  The charge arose after the name of a 14-year-old boy was published in a case in which the boy sought an irreconcilable differences order against his parents. The boy was painted as the source of the problem in the media; however, the findings of Child Protection authorities and the Children's Court of Victoria that led to the order may not have been available to Koch or the media at the time, due to legal restraints, and have never been aired in the subsequent public debates about this case and the law of irreconcilable differences. The Seven Network and the show's producer were convicted of the offence.

On 9 May 2006, Koch covered the Beaconsfield mine rescue live from Beaconsfield when the trapped miners Todd Russell and Brant Webb were rescued. Todd Russell was a fan of Sunrise and had been sending messages to Koch while trapped through rescue workers. After delaying Russell being transported to the hospital, Koch said that Russell invited him into the ambulance where he was given Russell's miner's tag from the safety board at the mine entrance. Koch's claim was verified by the emergency workers in charge of the vehicle. Koch later appeared on the ABC's The Glass House and talked about the incident, defending his actions.

On 4 December 2006, Koch told an inappropriate joke on air regarding the then prime minister John Howard's wife Janette Howard and the then Opposition Leader Kim Beazley. To this day, Howard still hasn't forgiven Koch over the joke, and refuses to appear on Sunrise.

On 18 January 2013, Koch attracted criticism after he made comments about breastfeeding. The controversy arose after a response to a story about a Queensland mother breastfeeding at a public pool. Koch commented that while agreeing with the right of mothers for public breastfeeding to do it discreetly is a common courtesy to others. The comment gained angry reactions, with threats that the Sunrise studio at Martin Place would be swamped by up to 800 angry breastfeeding mothers. Koch's comments were condemned by media consultant Mia Freedman.

On 16 April 2013, Koch was criticised after suggesting that the Boston Marathon bombing could have an "Irish" link. Koch discussed the aftermath of the Boston blast with a panel. Koch posed the question, "It's [Boston] a very big Irish Catholic city, we've got Margaret Thatcher's funeral coming up tomorrow in London. Is it a really long stretch to think they could be related?" Immediately after his comments Sunrise viewers went on Twitter to complain about Koch's question.

On 16 October 2018, Koch was reviewing a segment where Jamaican sprinter Usain Bolt was training with the Central Coast Mariners (a soccer team) in Australia's A-League. After asking whether the Mariners would get a lot of money for trading Bolt (and receiving an affirmative response from another panellist), Koch said: "Who said slavery was o[ver]...? any[way]... no. Given the context and the fact that Bolt is dark-skinned, the statement was interpreted as a reference to the Atlantic slave trade due to Bolt's dark-skinned appearance. Realising the tastelessness of the joke, Koch aborted the joke as he was saying it, and he later explained that "the use of the word 'slavery' is a reference I’ve used to defend players who want to trade clubs or change jobs in sport... that you can’t keep them... it’s a free world. There’s no slavery anymore. People have rights." There was extensive backlash about the incident on social media.

In 2017, Koch invited Dick Smith to an interview. He later kicked Smith off the show after he talked about immigration to Australia. Koch was also criticised.

On 18 March 2019, Koch interviewed One Nation Leader Pauline Hanson on the Sunrise program. Koch also was criticised by viewers for allegedly bullying Hanson and interrupting her answers to his questions. Koch said to Hanson that Brenton Tarrant's manifesto "reads like One Nation immigration and Muslim policy”.

References

External links

Kochie's Business Builders: Kochie's small business website
Your Money & your Life: Kochie's personal finance website
Sunrise on Seven

Pinstripe Media: Kochie's Video & Content Marketing Agency
Small Business First: Kochie's Small Business Network
Kochie's Digital Marketing Agency

1956 births
Living people
Australian television journalists
Australian television presenters
Australian financial writers
Australian people of German descent
Australian financial analysts
Television in Sydney
Journalists from Sydney
People from Adelaide
Port Adelaide Football Club administrators